Leonardo da Sarzana, also called Lionardo Sarzana was an Italian sculptor of the Renaissance, active from the mid to late 16th century.  His most famous sculpture is that of Pope Pius V made for the Sistine Chapel at Santa Maria Maggiore in Rome.

References

Bibliography
Rome seen in a week: being a hand-book to Rome and its environs'' By Luigi Piale (1898).

16th-century Italian sculptors
Italian male sculptors